Urocyclidae is a family of air-breathing land snails, semi-slugs and land slugs, terrestrial pulmonate gastropod mollusks in the superfamily Helicarionoidea, (according to the taxonomy of the Gastropoda by Bouchet & Rocroi, 2005).

Some species within this family make and use love darts before mating.

Distribution 
The Urocyclidae are distributed in the Afrotropical realm, including Madagascar, the Comores and the islands of the Gulf of Guinea.

Taxonomy 
The family Urocyclidae consists of 3 subfamilies (according to the taxonomy of the Gastropoda by Bouchet & Rocroi, 2005), that follows classification of Urocyclinae by Van Goethem (1977):
 subfamily Rhysotininae Schileyko, 2002
 subfamily Sheldoniinae Connolly, 1925 (1912) - synonyms: Peltatinae Godwin-Austen, 1912; Trochonanininae Connolly, 1912; Trochozonitinae Iredale, 1914; Ledoulxiinae Pilsbry, 1919; Gymnarionidae Von Mol, 1970; Rhysotinidae Schileyko, 2002; Zonitarionini Schileyko, 2002; Acantharionini Schileyko, 2002
 subfamily Urocyclinae Simroth, 1889
 tribe Urocyclini Simroth, 1889 - synonyms: Atoxonini Schileyko, 2002; Buettneriini Schileyko, 2002
 tribe Dendrolimacini Van Goethem, 1977
 tribe Leptichnini Van Goethem, 1977
 tribe Upembellini Van Goethem, 1977

Genera 
Genera within the family Urocyclidae include:
 unsorted
 † Koruella Pickford, 2009

Subfamily Rhysotininae Schileyko, 2002
 Rhysotina Ancey, 1887
 Thomeonanina Germain, 1909 : synonym of Rhysotina Ancey, 1887 (objective synonym)
Subfamily Sheldoniinae
 Acantharion Binder & Tillier, 1985
 Africarion Godwin-Austen, 1883
 Amatarion Van Mol, 1970
 Angustivestis Pilsbry, 1919
 Aspidelus Morelet, 1884
 Aspidotomium Degner, 1932
 Belonarion Pilsbry, 1919
 Bloyetia Bourguignat, 1890
 Camerunarion Van Mol, 1970
 Carinazingis van Bruggen & de Winter, 1990
 Centrafricarion Van Mol, 1970 
 Chlamydarion Van Mol, 1968
 Colparion Laidlaw, 1938
 Degneria Verdcourt, 1956
 Entagaricus Pilsbry, 1919
 Estria Poirier, 1887
 Falloonella Preston, 1914
 Fuellebornia Verdcourt, 1998
 Granularion Germain, 1912
 Gymnarion Pilsbry, 1919
 Hamya Bourguignat, 1885 †
 Kerkophorus Godwin-Austen, 1912
 Lacrimarion Connolly, 1939
 Malagarion Tillier, 1979
 Mesafricarion Pilsbry, 1919
 Microkerkus Godwin-Austen, 1912
 Montanobloyetia Verdcourt, 1961
 Morrumbalia Verdcourt, 1998
 Paragranularion Van Mol, 1970
 Percivalia Preston, 1914
 Plicatonanina Verdcourt, 1961
 Principicochlea D. Holyoak & G. Holyoak, 2020
 Principitrochoidea D. Holyoak & G. Holyoak, 2020
 Ptilototheca Herbert, 2016
 Rhopalogonium Degner, 1932
 Selatodryas Herbert, 2017
 Senegalarion Van Mol, 1970
 Sheldonia Ancey, 1887 - the type genus of the subfamily Sheldoniinae
 Sjostedtina Verdcourt, 1961
 Sylvarion Van Mol, 1970
 Thapsia Albers, 1860
 Thielarion Van Mol, 1970
 Thomithapsia D. Holyoak & G. Holyoak, 2020
 Thomitrochoidea D. Holyoak & G. Holyoak, 2020
  Tresia Van Goethem, 1975
 Trochonanina Mousson, 1869
 Trochozonites Pfeffer, 1883
 Tropidocochlion Verdcourt, 1998
 Verdcourtia Van Mol, 1970
 Verrucarion Van Mol, 1970 
 Zingis E. von Martens, 1878
 Zonitarion Pfeffer, 1883
 Ledoulxia Bourguignat, 1885: synonym of Trochonanina Mousson, 1869
 Peltatus Godwin-Austen, 1908: synonym of Sheldonia Ancey, 1887

 Subfamily Urocyclinae
Tribe Dendrolimacini
 Dendrolimax Heynemann, 1868 - the type genus of the tribe Dendrolimacini

Tribe Leptichnini
 Leptichnus Simroth, 1896 - the type genus of the tribe Leptichnini

Tribe Upembellini
 Leptichnoides Van Goethem, 1975
 Upembella Van Goethem, 1969 - the type genus of the tribe Upembellini

tribe Urocyclini
 Anisotoxon Van Goethem, 1975
 Atoxon Simroth, 1888
 Atoxonoides Van Goethem, 1973
 Atrichotoxon Simroth, 1910
 Buettneria Simroth, 1910 
 Bukobia Simroth, 1896
 Elisolimax Cockerell, 1893
 Emphysetes Verdcourt, 2003
 Microcyclus Simroth, 1896
 Nupnus Van Goethem, 1975
 Pembatoxon Van Goethem, 1975
 Phaneroporus Simroth, 1888
 Polytoxon Simroth, 1897
 Pseudatoxon Van Goethem, 1975
 Tanzalimax Rowson, Paustian & Van Goethem, 2017
 Trichotoxon Simroth, 1888
 Udzungwalimax Rowson, Paustian & Van Goethem, 2017
 Urocyclus Gray, 1864 - the type genus of the family Urocyclidae

Cladogram 
The following cladogram shows the phylogenic relationship of this family to other families in the limacoid clade:

References

External links